The Spell of Egypt is a 1910 travel book by the British writer Robert Hichens. It was originally published in 1908 as Egypt and Its Monuments. Hichens was known for his orientalist writing, and Egypt was a setting for several of his novels.

References

Bibliography
 Hsu-Ming Teo. Desert Passions: Orientalism and Romance Novels. University of Texas Press, 2012.

Works by Robert Hichens
British travel books